Hibonite is a mineral with the chemical formula , occurring in various colours, with a hardness of 7.5–8.0 and a hexagonal crystal structure. It is rare, but is found in high-grade metamorphic rocks on Madagascar. Some presolar grains in primitive meteorites consist of hibonite. Hibonite also is a common mineral in the Ca-Al-rich inclusions found in some chondritic meteorites. Hibonite is closely related to hibonite-Fe (IMA 2009-027) an alteration mineral from the Allende meteorite. Hibonites were among the first minerals to form as the disk of gas and dust swirling around the young sun cooled.

A very rare gem, hibonite was discovered in 1953 in Madagascar by Paul Hibon, a French prospector.

Colour
Hibonite can vary in colour, from a bright blue, to green, to orange, to a nearly black deep brown. The colour is related to the degree of oxidation; meteoritic hibonite tends to be blue.

See also
 Glossary of meteoritics

References
Webmineral

Calcium minerals
Lanthanide minerals
Aluminium minerals
Oxide minerals
Meteorite minerals
Hexagonal minerals
Minerals in space group 194